Lisa Barbelin (born 10 April 2000) is a French archer, who won the recurve events at the 2021 European Archery Championships, and 2022 European Indoor Archery Championships. She has previously won multiple medals at the World Youth Archery Championships, and won bronze medals in events at the 2019 and 2022 Archery World Cups. In June 2021 she was the world's number one ranked competitor. Barbelin competed in the women's individual event at the 2020 Summer Olympics.

Career

She competed at the 2017 European Junior Archery Cup, finishing third in the individual event in Marathon, Greece, and second in the individual and team events in Poreč, Croatia. That year she also came third in the team event at the 2017 World Youth Archery Championships. She was part of the French team that came third in the team event at the 2019 Archery World Cup event in Medellín, Colombia. In the same year, she competed in the World Youth Archery Championships, finishing second in the team event and fourth in the individual event. Later in the year, she attended a 10-day workshop in Gwangju, South Korea, where she was trained by former Olympic champion Ki Bo-bae. In February 2020, Barbelin won the French women's Olympic selection test event. During the COVID-19 pandemic lockdown in France, she trained in her parents' garden in Ley, Moselle. 

In December 2020, Barbelin came third at an Indoor Archery World Series that was held virtually. In March 2021, she won an event in Poreč. In June 2021, Barbelin won the recurve event at the 2021 European Archery Championships. She was the first French woman to win a European Archery Championships since Bérengère Schuh in 2008. As a result, she became the number one ranked women's archer, and she qualified for the women's individual event at the 2020 Summer Olympics. Her qualification was assured after winning her quarter-final match at the Championships. Her position as number one women's archer was brief as in the same month she was demoted to second place; she was overtaken by Indian Deepika Kumari. At the Games, Barbelin finished 13th in the ranking round, and was eliminated from the knockout section of the event in the round of 8. Later in the year, Barbelin was part of the French team that came third in the women's team event at the 2021 World Archery Championships. She was eliminated in the quarter-finals of the individual and mixed team events at the Championships.

She won the gold medal in the women's recurve event at the 2022 European Indoor Archery Championships held in Laško, Slovenia. She was part of the French team that finished third in the recurve event at the 2022 Archery World Cup event in Medellín, Colombia.

Personal life
Barbelin is from Ley, Moselle, France. She studies chemistry at Sorbonne University. Barbelin is also an amateur pianist.

References

External links
 

People from Dieuze
2000 births
Living people
French female archers
Sorbonne University
Olympic archers of France
Archers at the 2020 Summer Olympics
21st-century French women
Sportspeople from Moselle (department)